is a Japanese light novel series written by Kanata Yanagino and illustrated by Kususaga Rin. It began serialization online in May 2015 on the user-generated novel publishing website Shōsetsuka ni Narō. It was later acquired by Overlap, who have published four volumes since March 2016 under their Overlap Bunko imprint. A manga adaptation with art by Mutsumi Okuhashi has been serialized online via Overlap's Comic Gardo website since September 2017 and has been collected in eight tankōbon volumes. Both the light novel and manga are licensed in North America by J-Novel Club. An anime television series adaptation by Children's Playground Entertainment aired from October 2021 to January 2022. A second season has been announced.

Plot
In a city of the dead, long since ruined and far from human civilization, lives a single human child. His name is Will, and he's being raised by three undead: the hearty skeletal warrior, Blood; the graceful mummified priestess, Mary; and the crotchety spectral sorcerer, Gus. The three pour love into the boy, and teach him all they know.

But one day, Will starts to wonder: "Who am I?" Will must unravel the mysteries of this faraway dead man's land, and unearth the secret pasts of the undead. He must learn the love and mercy of the good gods, and the bigotry and madness of the bad. And when he knows it all, the boy will take his first step on the path to becoming a paladin.

"I promised you. It's gonna take a while, but I'll tell you everything. This is the story of the deaths of many heroes. It's the story of how we died, and it's the reason you grew up here."

Characters
 / 

William is a human boy reincarnated from our world, who retains his past memories while living in city of the dead. He was raised by Mary and Blood, while Gus teaches him magic. Eventually after he becomes of age, he learns of the truth about the God of the Undead Stagnate, whose echo he confronts and defeats with the help of his newly formed contract with Gracefeel, the Goddess of Light.

Blood is a skeletal warrior, and Will's foster father as well as his combat instructor. As a human, he was a worshipper of Blaze, the god of fire and technology. 

 A mummified priestess and Will's foster mother. She guided him about essential day-to-day tasks. She often serves him bread which Will finds out later on was a received through prayer sorcery. Mary had vowed to live according to the will of Mater the earth-mother but had to make a contract with Stagnate the god of the undead in order to continue their existence. Because of this betrayal, Mary catches fire every time she prays to Mater. 
 / 

Gus is a spectral sorcerer who is Will's foster grandfather as well as his teacher in sorcery. He is an irascible old man who didn't like getting bound, so his vows were to Whirl, the God of Wind, to live his life the way he chose and to enjoy it. 
 / 

A male half-elf archer that Will meets on the road after leaving home. While gruff and reluctant owing to previous bad experiences, he eventually comes to accept William as the first real friend he's had in his life.

The goddess to whom Will has devoted himself. She is the daughter of the gods Volt (god of justice and lightning) and Mater (goddess of the earth and child-rearing). Gracefeel is responsible for guiding the souls of the dead back into the cycle of rebirth by using her lantern to light their way. With her influence greatly diminished among the people in the other world, Will tries to act in her interest in order to spread her faith once again. He later confesses to Gracefeel that she has become the love of his life; an admission that the goddess responds to with a gentle, but not entirely reluctant rebuff. 

The deity of the Undead whom Blood, Mary, and Gus made a contract to. She is the eldest daughter of Volt and Mater, and Gracefeel's older sister. Although she is female, her echo assumes a male form.

A traveling salesman that Will meets and befriends.
 / 

A halfling bard. She tells tales, sings, and in the anime, she plays a three-stringed rebec.

The crown prince of the Southmark kingdom and ruler of the city of Whitesails.

A bishop who is in charge of the temple in Whitesails and is a rather rude but caring character.

A novice priestess at the Whitesails temple, and Bishop Bagley's adopted daughter. She later becomes Reystov's wife.

An adventurer that Will hires while in Whitesails. Originally a member of a mountain tribe in a region known as Volt's Stove, he became a warrior to avenge his family after they were massacred by a neighbor village, but later gave up on this revenge quest and became a renowned adventuring warrior.
 / 
A young dwarf who is a descendant and heir of Aurvangr, the last king of the dwarven realm of the Iron Mountains before its fall to the demon monster hordes. Although kind and considerate, he has become introverted and deadly shy due to the pressure of the expectations set on him by his fellow dwarves. After William re-encourages him, he becomes the Paladin's squire and travelling companion.

Media

Light novels
The series is written by Kanata Yanagino and illustrated by Kususaga Rin. It began serialization online in May 2015 on the user-generated novel publishing website Shōsetsuka ni Narō. It was later acquired by Overlap, who has published four volumes since March 2016 under their Overlap Bunko imprint. J-Novel Club licensed the series for English publication.

Manga
A manga adaptation with art by Mutsumi Okuhashi has been serialized online via Overlap's Comic Gardo website since September 25, 2017. It has been collected in ten tankōbon volumes. J-Novel Club is also publishing it in English.

Anime
An anime television series adaptation was announced on April 17, 2021. The series is animated by Children's Playground Entertainment and directed by Yuu Nobuta, with Tatsuya Takahashi overseeing the series' scripts, Koji Haneda designing the characters, and Ryūichi Takada and Keigo Hoashi from MONACA composing the music. It aired from October 9, 2021 to January 3, 2022 on Tokyo MX, AT-X, and BS NTV. 
The opening theme is "The Sacred Torch" performed by H-el-ical// while the ending theme is "Shirushibi" (Mark of Fire) performed by Nagi Yanagi. Crunchyroll has licensed the series outside of Asia and Oceania (excluding Australia and Zealand), while Medialink licensed the series in South Asia, Southeast Asia, and the rest of Oceania, and co-licensed with Disney+ through Star content hub in Taiwan, Hong Kong and selected Southeast Asia countries. On December 25, 2021, a second season was announced to be in production.

On October 28, 2021, Crunchyroll announced the series will receive an English dub, which premiered on November 27, 2021.

Notes

References

External links
 at Shōsetsuka ni Narō 
 
 
 

2016 Japanese novels
Anime and manga based on light novels
Crunchyroll anime
Fiction about reincarnation
Isekai anime and manga
Isekai novels and light novels
J-Novel Club books
Japanese webcomics
Light novels
Light novels first published online
Medialink
Overlap Bunko
Shōnen manga
Shōsetsuka ni Narō
Upcoming anime television series
Webcomics in print